The women's 3000 metres event at the 1975 Summer Universiade was held at the Stadio Olimpico in Rome on 18 September. It was the first time that an event this long was held for women at the Universiade.

Results

References

Athletics at the 1975 Summer Universiade
1975